Local elections were held in Olongapo City on May 9, 2016 within the Philippine general election. The voters will elect candidates for the elective local posts in the city: the mayor, vice mayor, and ten councilors.

Mayoralty Election
Incumbent Mayor Rolen Paulino is running for reelection as Mayor under the Liberal Party, his running mate is Councilor Jong Cortez.

His opponent are former Mayor James L. Gordon Jr. is set to make a political comeback after 3 years. He is running under the Bagumbayan-VNP, his running mate is incumbent Vice Mayor Rodel Cerezo and Independent candidate Octavio Galvezo.

Candidates

Mayor

Vice Mayor

Councilors

Team Paulino

Straight Gordon Ticket

|-bgcolor=black
|colspan=10|

References

2016 Philippine local elections
Elections in Olongapo